Gregory Shahade (born December 22, 1978) is an International Master of chess. He founded the New York Masters and the U.S. Chess League. He is a former member of the executive board of the United States Chess Federation, to which his younger sister Jennifer Shahade was hired as the executive editor-in-chief of the website.  Greg had a distinguished scholastic career, highlighted by three national chess championships: tying for first in the 1993 National Junior High School Championship and the 1996 National High School Championship, and winning the 1996 United States Junior Open outright. He was the leading scorer for Julia R. Masterman School in 1996, when they won their first of four National High School Chess Championships.   He won the prestigious Samford Fellowship, awarded by the U.S. Chess Trust to the top U.S. prospect under the age of 25, in 1999.  The fellowship granted Shahade approximately $25,000 to train for and play in top tournaments. He was also renewed for it in 2000 and subsequently scored his first Grandmaster norm at the Bermuda Closed in January 2001. Since 2006, he has held 30 sessions of the US Chess School, where the nation's top young chess talents are invited to train under the instruction of various Grandmasters.  He was the founder and Commissioner of the U.S. Chess League, which folded in 2016.

His father is FIDE Master Michael Shahade and his mother was Drexel University chemistry professor and author Sally Solomon. His sister is Woman Grandmaster Jennifer Shahade.

Starting in October 2007, Shahade has been making chess videos at ChessVideos.tv. He is the host of U.S. Chess lessons in where he invites coaches to teach for future chess prodigies.

Currently, Shahade is the commissioner of Professional Rapid Online Chess League.

Career Highlights 

He was a chess prodigy, having started playing at a very young age. He won the all-America U-13 chess cup.

References

External links 

 
 
 
 
 
 Full list of Greg's videos on ChessVideos.tv
 Greg's current USCF rating

1978 births
Living people
American chess players
Chess International Masters
American people of Arab descent
Jewish chess players
20th-century American Jews
21st-century American Jews